Mercenary marriage may refer to:
 Bride-buying
 Wife selling